The black marlin (Istiompax indica) is a species of marlin found in tropical and subtropical areas of the Indian and Pacific Oceans. Black marlin are fished commercially and are also a highly prized game fish. Black marlins have been known to drag Maldivian fishing boats of the ancient times for very long distances until it got tired; and then it would then take many hours for the fishermen to row or sail back home.

Taxonomy
French naturalist Georges Cuvier described the black marlin in 1832 as Tetrapturus indicus.

Description
Compared to striped or white marlins and sailfish, black marlins are more solid than their blue counterparts. They have a shorter bill and a rounder and lower dorsal fin.

Distribution
The species occurs in the tropical and subtropical Indo-Pacific, with uncommon movements into temperate waters, and rare reports from the Atlantic.

Diet 
Diet mostly consists of various fish and cephalopods. They may eat tuna, mackerel, snake mackerel, flying fish, squid, crustaceans, octopus, etc.

See also

 Billfish in the Indian Ocean

References

Tony Ayling & Geoffrey Cox, Collins Guide to the Sea Fishes of New Zealand, (William Collins Publishers Ltd., Auckland, New Zealand 1982) 

Fish described in 1832
Fish of Hawaii
Fish of Pakistan
Istiophoridae
Sport fish
Taxa named by Georges Cuvier